The Ghost and Mrs. Muir is a 1947 American romantic fantasy film starring Gene Tierney and Rex Harrison. It was directed by Joseph L. Mankiewicz, and is based on a 1945 novel written by Josephine Leslie under the pseudonym of R.A. Dick. In 1945, 20th Century Fox bought the film rights to the novel, published only in the United Kingdom at that time. It was shot entirely in California.

Plot 

In Britain in the early 1900s, recently widowed Mrs Lucy Muir moves to the seaside village of Whitecliff despite the disapproval of her in-laws. She rents a house there named Gull Cottage, although it has a reputation as being haunted by the spirit of a seaman who accidentally died there.

On the first night after moving in with her young daughter, Anna, and her loyal maid, Martha, Lucy is visited by an apparition of the former owner, a roguish but harmless sea captain named Daniel Gregg. He tells Lucy that his death four years ago was not a suicide, but the result of accidentally kicking the valve on a gas-fired room heater in his sleep. Daniel explains that he wanted to turn Gull Cottage into a home for retired seamen and does not appreciate her presence, having personally frightened away previous visitors. However, due to Lucy's headstrong attitude, as well as her appreciation of the house, Daniel reluctantly agrees to allow her to live in Gull Cottage and he promises to make himself visible only to her.

Lucy's poor investment — her only source of income — has dried up, and she considers a move back to London. However, Daniel has warmed up to her and asks her to stay. They decide to write a book, a dictation of his memories from his time at sea, for which she will profit. During the course of writing the book, they fall in love. Both realize it is a hopeless situation, and Daniel tells Lucy that she should find a living man to be with. In London, Lucy goes to meet a publisher and becomes attracted to Miles Fairley, a suave author who writes children's stories under the pen name Uncle Neddy. Daniel's lurid and sensational recollections, titled Blood and Swash, become a bestseller, providing Lucy with royalties which she uses to buy Gull Cottage. Fairley follows her back to Whitecliff and they begin a whirlwind courtship after Fairley claims he fell in love with her at first sight. Though initially jealous of their relationship, Daniel decides to leave, as he considers himself an obstacle to Lucy's chance at happiness. While she is asleep, he places in her mind the suggestion that she alone wrote the book and his presence was merely a dream. He then fades away after declaring his regret that he never had a life with her.

Fairley sends a note cancelling a planned visit to Gull Cottage, saying he will be in London for a few days. Later, Lucy visits London to sign a contract, and obtains Fairley's address in the city from the office clerk to pay a surprise visit. She discovers that Fairley (who is not at home) is already married with two children, and that Fairley has romanced other women in the past. Heartbroken, Lucy returns to Whitecliff to spend the rest of her life as a recluse, with Martha looking after her.

Anna, now at university, returns with a Royal Navy lieutenant she plans to marry. In the course of a conversation with her mother, Anna reveals that she too had seen Daniel, whom she regarded as a childhood friend, and she knew about her mother's relationship with Fairley. Lucy in turn reveals that Fairley is now an overweight alcoholic, abandoned by his wife and children. Through the conversation, Lucy realizes that the ghost she loved was in fact real.

Many years later, now ailing and under a doctor's care, Lucy receives a letter from Anna, informing her that Anna's daughter - also named Lucy - is engaged to a plane captain. Anna believes that affection for captains runs in their family. Lucy rejects the glass of hot milk Martha has brought for her with a complaint that she is tired. After Martha leaves the room, Lucy takes a sip, but the glass falls to the floor as she dies. Suddenly, Daniel returns and approaches her, whispering that she will never be tired again. Taking his hands, her young spirit leaves her aged body and greets him with a loving smile. Unnoticed by Martha, the couple leave the house and walk arm-in-arm into an ethereal mist.

Cast 
 Gene Tierney as Lucy Muir
 Rex Harrison as Captain Daniel Gregg
 George Sanders as Miles Fairley
 Edna Best as Martha Huggins
 Vanessa Brown as Anna Muir (as an adult)
 Anna Lee as Mrs. Fairley
 Natalie Wood as Anna Muir (as a child)
 Robert Coote as Mr. Coombe
 Isobel Elsom as Angelica Muir, Lucy's mother-in-law
 Victoria Horne as Eva Muir, Lucy's sister-in-law
 Whitford Kane as Mr. Sproule, the publisher (uncredited)
 Stuart Holmes as Man ordered out of train compartment by the Captain (uncredited)

Production 
Although Joseph Mankiewicz had an excellent reputation as a screenwriter, Philip Dunne says Mankiewicz's only contribution to this script was writing a couple of "excellent lines" for George Sanders' character. Sanders' casting came about when Richard Ney, the original actor playing the role, was fired for being inadequate in the part. Bernard Herrmann, the composer of the film's music, regarded it as his finest score.

Reception 
The New York Times called The Ghost and Mrs. Muir "a pleasurable film, despite its failings," singling out Edna Best for "by far the best performannce [sic]". In the writer's opinion, Harrison "has such an ingratiating personality that this compensates in large measure for the lack of characterization in his role," but Tierney "is a pretty girl, but has no depth of feeling as an actress."

Variety, on the other hand, praised the actors and the film unreservedly: “Gene Tierney gives what undoubtedly is her best performance to date. It’s warmly human... the out-of-this-world romance pulls audience sympathy with an infectious tug that never slackens. In his role as the lusty, seafaring shade, Rex Harrison commands the strongest attention...Philip Dunne’s script lards the R. A. Dick novel with gusty humor and situations that belie the ghostly theme. Dialog makes full use of salty expressions to point up chuckles.”

The film holds a 100% rating on Rotten Tomatoes, with an average critic rating of 8.23/10.

Awards 
Charles Lang received a 1947 Academy Award nomination for his black-and-white cinematography on the movie.

The film is recognized by American Film Institute in these lists:
 2002: AFI's 100 Years...100 Passions – #73
 2005: AFI's 100 Years of Film Scores – Nominated
 2008: AFI's 10 Top 10:
 Nominated Fantasy Film

Adaptations to other media 
The Ghost and Mrs. Muir was adapted as an hour-long radio play on the December 1, 1947 broadcast of Lux Radio Theater with Charles Boyer and Madeleine Carroll and was adapted on the August 16, 1951 Screen Director's Playhouse with Boyer and Jane Wyatt. A 90-minute adaptation by Barry Campbell of the novel was broadcast on BBC Radio 4 on 21 December 1974 with Bryan Pringle as Captain Gregg, Gemma Jones as Lucy Muir, and Philip Bond as Miles.

From 1968 to 1970, a TV series titled The Ghost & Mrs. Muir, starring Hope Lange and Edward Mulhare, aired on NBC and then ABC. It had the same premise and main characters as the book and film, but it was a situation comedy, downplaying the romantic fantasy elements and focusing on broad humor. The time and setting were changed, with the action taking place in a contemporary American coastal town (although the ghost was portrayed as being from the Victorian era). For the series, Mrs. Muir's first name was changed from Lucy to Carolyn, and the children's names were changed from Cyril and Anna (in the original novel) to Jonathan and Candace.

In April 1994, Variety continued its reporting on Sean Connery's being slated to play the Captain in a version of the story for 20th Century Fox. The project was still “in the pipeline” in 1997.

On June 3, 2005, a musical based on the film and the book, written and directed by James J. Mellon, had its world premiere at the NoHo Arts Center in Los Angeles. Variety gave it a mixed review.

DVD and Blu Ray releases
The film was released on Blu-ray in 2013 by 20th Century Fox after being selected in Fox's Voice Your Choice promotion. It previously was released on DVD as part of the 20th Century Fox Studio Classics collection.

See also
 List of ghost films

References

External links 

 
 
 
 
Streaming audio
 The Ghost and Mrs. Muir on Lux Radio Theater: December 1, 1947 
 The Ghost and Mrs. Muir on Screen Directors Playhouse: August 16, 1951

1945 novels
1940s ghost films
1940s romantic fantasy films
1947 films
20th Century Fox films
American romantic comedy-drama films
American romantic fantasy films
American black-and-white films
American ghost films
American supernatural romance films
Fictional couples
Films about widowhood
Films adapted into television shows
Films based on British novels
Films based on fantasy novels
Films based on romance novels
Films directed by Joseph L. Mankiewicz
Films scored by Bernard Herrmann
Films set in England
Films set in London
Films set in the 1900s
Films with screenplays by Philip Dunne
1940s English-language films
1940s American films